The 2016 NCAA Division I women's soccer tournament (also known as the 2016 Women's College Cup) was the 35th annual single-elimination tournament to determine the national champion of NCAA Division I women's collegiate soccer. The semi-finals and championship game were played at Avaya Stadium in San Jose, California from December 2–4, 2016 while the preceding rounds were played at various sites across the country during November 2016.

Qualification

All Division I women's soccer programs were eligible to qualify for the tournament. The tournament field remains fixed at 64 teams. 28 teams received automatic bids by winning their conference tournaments, 3 teams received automatic bids by claiming the conference regular season crown (Ivy League, Pac-12 Conference, and West Coast Conference don't hold conference tournaments) and an additional 33 teams earned at-large bids based on their regular season records.

Teams

Stanford bracket

Schedule

First round

Second round

Round of 16

Quarter-finals

Florida bracket

Schedule

First round

Second round

Round of 16

Quarter-finals

South Carolina bracket

Schedule

First round

Second round

Round of 16

Quarter-finals

West Virginia bracket

Schedule

First round

Second round

Round of 16

Quarter-finals

College Cup

Schedule

Final Four

Championship

Statistics

Goalscorers
4 goals

 Brooke Ramsier – Auburn

3 goals

 Toni Payne – Duke
 Madison Schultz – North Carolina
 Sophie Groff – South Carolina
 Morgan Andrews – USC
 Katie Johnson – USC
 Michaela Abam – West Virginia

2 goals

 Mariah Williams – Albany
 Kristen Dodson – Auburn
 Bri Folds – Auburn
 Michele Vasconcelos – BYU
 Maddie Damm – Connecticut
 Ella Stevens – Duke
 Meggie Dougherty Howard – Florida
 Brooke Sharp – Florida
 Marina Paul – Georgetown
 Dorian Bailey – North Carolina
 Kassidy Gorman – Northwestern
 Nikki Walts – Ohio State
 Maddie Gonzalez – Santa Clara
 Jordan Jesolva – Santa Clara
 Chelsea Drennan – South Carolina
 Charlotte Williams – Penn State
 Madison Tiernan – Rutgers
 Amber Munerlyn – UCLA
 Alexis Shaffer – Virginia
 Ashley Lawrence – West Virginia

1 goal

 Jessi Hartzler – Arkansas
 Lindsey Mayo – Arkansas
 Haley Gerken – Auburn
 Gianna Montini – Auburn
 Casie Ramsier – Auburn
 Ashley Hatch – BYU
 Elena Medeiros – BYU
 Arielle Ship – California
 Shannon Horgan – Clemson
 Danica Evans – Colorado
 Alexa Casimiro – Connecticut
 Rachel Hill – Connecticut
 Stephanie Ribeiro – Connecticut
 Alexis Kiehl – Dayton
 Libby Leedom – Dayton
 Mia Gyau – Duke
 Casey Martinez – Duke
 Devan Talley – Eastern Washington
 Savannah Jordan – Florida
 Julia Lester – Florida
 Malia Berkely – Florida State
 Deyna Castellanos – Florida State
 Megan Connolly – Florida State
 Macayla Edwards – Florida State
 Heidi Kollanen – Florida State
 Amanda Carolan – Georgetown
 Rachel Corboz – Georgetown
 Grace Damaska – Georgetown
 Crystal Thomas – Georgetown
 Emily Dickman – Illinois State
 Lauren Koehl – Illinois State
 Brooke Ksiazek – Illinois State
 Lois Heuchan – Kansas
 Chanel Hudson-Marks – Memphis
 Jada Dayne – Michigan
 Nicky Waldeck – Michigan
 Rachael Ivanicki – Monmouth
 Taylor Porter – NC State
 Abby Elinsky – North Carolina
 Maya Worth – North Carolina
 Nandi Mehta – Northwestern
 Kayla Sharples – Northwestern
 Sammy Edwards – Ohio State
 Rachel Ressler – Oklahoma
 Paige Welch – Oklahoma
 Courtney Dike – Oklahoma State
 Nickolette Driesse – Penn State
 Emma Hasco – Penn State
 Megan Schafer – Penn State
 Marissa Sheva – Penn State
 Danielle Thomas – Pepperdine
 Taylor Aylmer – Rutgers
 Brittany Ambrose – Santa Clara
 Jenna Holtz – Santa Clara
 Julie Vass – Santa Clara
 Elexa Bahr – South Carolina
 Daija Griffin – South Carolina
 Savannah McCaskill – South Carolina
 Claire Studebaker – South Carolina
 Kyra Carusa – Stanford
 Logan Karam – Stanford
 Sam Tran – Stanford
 Michelle Xiao – Stanford
 Stephanie Malherbe – Texas A&M
 Annie Alvarado – UCLA
 Jessie Fleming – UCLA
 Zoey Goralski – UCLA
 Anika Rodriguez – UCLA
 Alex Anthony – USC
 Nicole Molen – USC
 Leah Pruitt – USC
 Haylee Cacciacarne – Utah
 Katie Rogers – Utah
 Natalie Vukic – Utah
 Betsy Brandon – Virginia
 Meghan Cox – Virginia
 Kristen McNabb – Virginia
 Morgan Reuther – Virginia
 Taylor Ziemer – Virginia
 Sh'nia Gordon – West Virginia
 Heather Kaleiohi – West Virginia
 Alli Magaletta – West Virginia
 Rose Lavelle – Wisconsin
 Micaela Powers – Wisconsin
 Dani Rhodes – Wisconsin

Own goals

 Natalie Calhoun – Oklahoma State (playing against Colorado)
 Haley Woodard – Oklahoma State (playing against Colorado)
Unknown – Virginia (playing against Georgetown)
Unknown – Wisconsin (playing against Florida)

See also 
 NCAA Women's Soccer Championships (Division II, Division III)
 NCAA Men's Soccer Championships (Division I, Division II, Division III)

References

NCAA Tournament
NCAA Women's Soccer Championship
NCAA Division I Women's Soccer Tournament
NCAA Division I Women's Soccer Tournament
NCAA Division I Women's Soccer Tournament
Tournament